Yani dyunya is a Crimean Tatar-language weekly newspaper, published in Simferopol on Fridays, with a circulation of around 3.700 copies.

The newspaper was founded in Moscow in 1918; its first director was the Turkish Communist Mustafa Suphi. The newspaper was later moved to Simferopol, and in the late 1930s renamed to Къызыл Къырым (Red Crimea). It was closed with the deportation of the Crimean Tatars in 1944, and refounded in 1957 in Tashkent with the name  (Lenin's flag) as an organ of the Central Committee of the Uzbek SSR Communist Party. In the seventies it was printed thrice a week with a circulation of 23,000.

In 1991 the newspaper returned to Simferopol and to its old name of Янъы дюнья, which it keeps up to today.

References 

Weekly newspapers published in Ukraine
Weekly newspapers published in Russia
Newspapers published in Uzbekistan